Scattering Stars Like Dust is a solo album by Iranian musician Kayhan Kalhor, released on 9 June 1998 in the United States through Traditional Crossroads records.

Scattering Stars Like Dust is a 47-minute suite for Kamancheh and the Tombak drum. Like most Persian music, it is improvised and based on a large traditional collection of short, melodic motifs. It contains three sections. Some unusual time signatures come from Kurdish music and the album's title from a poem by Rumi.

Track listing

Personnel
Pejman Hadadi – Tombak
Kayhan Kalhor – Kamancheh

References

Kayhan Kalhor albums
1998 albums